Nord-Gudbrandsdal District Court was a district court in Innlandet county, Norway. The court was based in Vågåmo. The court existed from 1731 until 2021. It served the municipalities of Dovre, Lesja, Lom, Nord-Fron, Sel, Skjåk, and Vågå. Cases from this court could be appealed to Eidsivating Court of Appeal.

The court was a court of first instance. Its judicial duties were mainly to settle criminal cases and to resolve civil litigation as well as bankruptcy. The administration and registration tasks of the court included death registration, issuing certain certificates, performing duties of a notary public, and officiating civil wedding ceremonies. Cases from this court were heard by a combination of professional judges and lay judges.

History
The Nord-Gudbrandsdal district court was established in 1731 when the Gudbrandsdal District Court was divided into Nord-Gudbrandsdal District Court and Sør-Gudbrandsdal District Court. This court originally included Lesja, Lom, Fron, and Vågå. In 1734, the court's jurisdictional area was reduced when Fron was transferred from this court to the Sør-Gudbrandsdal District Court. In 1909, the Mellom-Gudbrandsdal District Court was abolished and Nord-Fron was merged back into this court's jurisdiction. From 1966-1977, Nord-Fron was part of the Sør-Gudbrandsdal District Court, but in 1977 it was moved back. On 26 April 2021, the court was merged with the Gjøvik District Court, Sør-Gudbrandsdal District Court, and Valdres District Court to create the new Vestre Innlandet District Court.

References

Defunct district courts of Norway
Organisations based in Vågå
1731 establishments in Norway
2021 disestablishments in Norway